The Kellams Bridge, also known as the Little Equinunk Bridge and Kellams–Stalker Bridge, is an underspanned suspension bridge spanning the Delaware River between Stalker, Pennsylvania, and Hankins, New York.

History 
The bridge was built by David Kellams in 1889 and opened in 1890. It was originally a toll bridge.

The bridge has historic significance as the last underspanned suspension bridge remaining in the United States. The deck of the bridge underwent major repairs in 1936, including replacement of the original wooden deck with the steel deck which remains today. The bridge was damaged by the June 2006 flooding of the Delaware River but was repaired in October 2006.

In 2018, as part of the Upper Delaware River bridge construction or renovation project, Kellams Bridge was temporarily closed for a $4.5 million renovation from March 5 to June 29 and then again from September 5 to November 15.

See also 
List of bridges documented by the Historic American Engineering Record in New York (state)
List of bridges documented by the Historic American Engineering Record in Pennsylvania
List of crossings of the Delaware River
New York–Pennsylvania Joint Interstate Bridge Commission

References

External links 

Bridgemeister

Bridges over the Delaware River
Historic American Engineering Record in New York (state)
Historic American Engineering Record in Pennsylvania
Bridges in Wayne County, Pennsylvania
Bridges in Sullivan County, New York
Steel bridges in the United States
Bridges completed in 1890
Former toll bridges in New York (state)
Former toll bridges in Pennsylvania
Road bridges in New York (state)
Road bridges in Pennsylvania
1890 establishments in New York (state)
1890 establishments in Pennsylvania
Interstate vehicle bridges in the United States
New York–Pennsylvania Joint Interstate Bridge Commission